The following are the national records in athletics in Rwanda maintained by its national athletics federation: Fédération Rwandaise d'Athlétisme (FRA).

Outdoor
Key to tables:

+ = en route to a longer distance

h = hand timing

A = affected by altitude

Men

Women

Indoor

Men

Women

References
General
Rwandan Outdoor Records 31 December 2019 updated
Specific

External links

Rwanda
Records
Athletics
Athletics